Qazhal (also spelled Gazzal or Kazhil) is a village in western Syria, administratively part of the Homs Governorate, just west of Homs. Nearby localities include the al-Waer suburb of Homs to the east, Khirbet al-Sawda to the north, Khirbet Tin Mahmoud to the northwest and Khirbet Tin Nur to the southwest. According to the Central Bureau of Statistics (CBS), Qazhal had a population of 2,271 in the 2004 census. Its inhabitants are predominantly Turkmens.

References

Populated places in Homs District
Turkmen communities in Syria